Kevin Blair Spirtas is an American actor.

Career
Spirtas is perhaps best known for his roles as Dr. Craig Wesley on the soap opera Days of Our Lives, Jonas Chamberlain on the ABC soap opera One Life to Live, and as Nick in the slasher film Friday the 13th Part VII: The New Blood (1988). Spirtas has worked on Broadway, with roles including Hugh Jackman's understudy in The Boy from Oz. He began using the name "Kevin Spirtas" professionally in 1995, having been previously credited as "Kevin Blair".

In 2015, Spirtas portrayed Dominic Delacort on the soap opera web series Winterthorne. In 2016, he was nominated for an Indie Series Award for Best Guest Actor in a Drama, and a Daytime Emmy Award for Outstanding Actor in a Digital Daytime Drama Series for the role.

Personal life
Spirtas was born in St. Louis, Missouri, the son of Sandra, who is active in community politics, and Arnold Spirtas, who runs an environmental demolition company. Spirtas graduated from Ladue Horton Watkins High School in 1980.

He was raised Jewish and is openly gay.

Filmography

 The Hills Have Eyes Part II (1984) - Roy
 Rituals (1984) - Tom Gallagher (1984–1985)
 The Facts of Life (1986) - Doug
 Friday the 13th Part VII: The New Blood (1988) - Nicholas Rogers
 Quantum Leap (1989) - Bob Thompson
 Bloodstone: Subspecies II (1993) - Mel 
 Bloodlust: Subspecies III (1994) - Mel
 Valley of the Dolls (1994, series) - Tim Burke
 Silk Stalkings (1995) - Steven Kincade
 Raging Angels (1995) - Zealot 
 Who Killed Buddy Blue? (1995) - Brad Caesar
 Green Plaid Shirt (1997) - Guy
 Married... with Children (1996) - Instructor
 A Match Made in Heaven (1997) - Bruce
 Fired Up (1997) - John
 Days of Our Lives (1997–2003, 2005, 2009, 2022) - Craig Wesley
 Defying Gravity (1997) - Bartender
 Striking Resemblance (1997) - Michael / Mitchell
 The Young and the Restless (1997)
 Apt Pupil (1998) - Paramedic
 Embrace the Darkness (1999) - Galen
 Friends (2000) - Dr. Wesley
 V.I.P. (2000) - Mr. Groom
 God's Helper (2001) - Dwight
 Love Bytes (2001) - Jesus
 Daredevil (2003) - Prosecutor at Jackson Trial (Director's cut)
 Horror High (2005) - Lt. Hellstrom
 One Life to Live (2008) - Jonas Chamberlain
 Albino Farm (2009) - Preacher
 Hustling (TV series; 2012–2014) - Joel
 The Dark Rite (2015) - Man
 Winterthorne (2015) - Dominic Delacort
 Backstabbed (2016) - Max Rhymer
 After Forever (2017– ) - Brian
 Blood Bound (2018) - Man
 Days of Our Lives: The Digital Series (2019) - Craig Wesley

References

External links
 
 
 

American male film actors
American male soap opera actors
American stunt performers
American male television actors
American gay actors
Jewish American male actors
Ladue Horton Watkins High School alumni
LGBT Jews
LGBT people from Missouri
Living people
Male actors from St. Louis
21st-century American Jews
Year of birth missing (living people)